Masarm-e Olya (also Romanized as Māşarm-e ‘Olyā; also known as Māsaram and Māsarm-e Bāla) is a village in Kuh Mareh Sorkhi Rural District, Arzhan District, Shiraz County, Fars Province, Iran. At the 2006 census, its population was 184, in 43 families.

References 

Populated places in Shiraz County